The 2022 Hylo Open was a badminton tournament which took place at the Saarlandhalle in Saarbrücken, Germany, from 1 to 6 November 2022 and had a total prize of US$180,000.

Tournament
The 2022 Hylo Open was the nineteenth tournament according to the 2022 BWF World Tour. It was a part of the Hylo Open, which had been held since 1988. This tournament was organized by the local organizer with sanction from the BWF.

Venue
This international tournament was held at the Saarlandhalle in Saarbrücken, Germany.

Point distribution
Below is the point distribution table for each phase of the tournament based on the BWF points system for the BWF World Tour Super 300 event.

Prize money 
The total prize money for this tournament was US$180,000. The distribution of the prize money was in accordance with BWF regulations.

Men's singles

Seeds 

 Anders Antonsen (withdrew)
 Lee Zii Jia (withdrew)
 Chou Tien-chen (final)
 Loh Kean Yew (quarter-finals)
 Anthony Sinisuka Ginting (champion)
 Jonatan Christie (quarter-finals)
 Lakshya Sen (first round)
 Kunlavut Vitidsarn (quarter-finals)

Finals

Top half

Section 1

Section 2

Bottom half

Section 3

Section 4

Women's singles

Seeds 

 Carolina Marín (quarter-finals)
 Pornpawee Chochuwong (second round)
 Nozomi Okuhara (semi-finals)
 Busanan Ongbamrungphan (second round)
 Michelle Li (withdrew)
 Mia Blichfeldt (first round)
 Kirsty Gilmour (second round)
 Line Christophersen (second round)

Finals

Top half

Section 1

Section 2

Bottom half

Section 3

Section 4

Men's doubles

Seeds 

 Takuro Hoki / Yugo Kobayashi (quarter-finals)
 Kim Astrup / Anders Skaarup Rasmussen (semi-finals)
 Satwiksairaj Rankireddy / Chirag Shetty (quarter-finals)
 Goh Sze Fei / Nur Izzuddin (withdrew)
 Mark Lamsfuß / Marvin Seidel (quarter-finals)
 Liang Weikeng / Wang Chang (quarter-finals)
 Ben Lane / Sean Vendy (semi-finals)
 Muhammad Shohibul Fikri / Bagas Maulana  (first round)

Finals

Top half

Section 1

Section 2

Bottom half

Section 3

Section 4

Women's doubles

Seeds 

 Jongkolphan Kititharakul / Rawinda Prajongjai (final)
 Gabriela Stoeva / Stefani Stoeva (second round)
 Pearly Tan / Thinaah Muralitharan (withdrew)
 Zhang Shuxian / Zheng Yu (semi-finals)
 Du Yue / Li Wenmei (withdrew)
 Chloe Birch / Lauren Smith (withdrew)
 Maiken Fruergaard / Sara Thygesen (withdrew)
 Benyapa Aimsaard / Nuntakarn Aimsaard (champions)

Finals

Top half

Section 1

Section 2

Bottom half

Section 3

Section 4

Mixed doubles

Seeds 

 Yuta Watanabe / Arisa Higashino (withdrew)
 Thom Gicquel / Delphine Delrue (semi-finals)
 Mark Lamsfuß / Isabel Lohau (first round)
 Tan Kian Meng / Lai Pei Jing (first round)
 Mathias Christiansen / Alexandra Bøje (quarter-finals)
 Goh Soon Huat / Shevon Jemie Lai (second round)
 Rinov Rivaldy / Pitha Haningtyas Mentari (quarter-finals)
 Robin Tabeling / Selena Piek (second round)

Finals

Top half

Section 1

Section 2

Bottom half

Section 3

Section 4

References

External links 
Tournament link

SaarLorLux Open
Hylo Open
Hylo Open
Hylo Open